The Social Democratic Labour Party of Norway (in Norwegian Norges Socialdemokratiske Arbeiderparti) was a Norwegian political party in the 1920s. Following the Labour Party's entry into the Comintern in 1919 its right wing left the party to form the Social Democratic Labour Party in 1921. At the party convention in 1923, however, the Labour Party withdrew from Comintern, and the Communist Party of Norway was formed by the minority, who continued its affiliation with Comintern and the Soviet Union until 1991. The Social Democratic Labour Party was absorbed into the reorganised Labour Party in 1927.

The youth wing of the party was the Socialist Youth League of Norway.

The party sympathized with the International Working Union of Socialist Parties from 1921 to 1923 and was a member of the Labour and Socialist International between 1923 and 1927.

References

 
Defunct political parties in Norway
Political parties established in 1921
1921 establishments in Norway
Political parties disestablished in 1927
Members of the Labour and Socialist International
Social democratic parties
Labour parties